Scolopendra cingulata, also known as Megarian banded centipede, and the Mediterranean banded centipede, is a species of centipede, and "the most common scolopendromorph species in the Mediterranean area".

Description

The species has alternating bands of black and yellow-gold.

Its venom is also not as toxic as that of other scolopendrid centipedes.

Distribution
Widely distributed, this species can be found throughout southern Europe, including Portugal and around the Mediterranean Sea, in such countries as Spain, France, Italy, Croatia and Greece, as well as parts of North Africa and Eastern Europe, in Albania and Ukraine.

Habitat
Scolopendra cingulata is a burrowing animal, preferring dark, damp environments such as beneath logs and in leaf litter.

Diet
Scolopendra cingulata is an opportunistic carnivore. It will attack and consume almost any animal that is not larger than itself. These include insects and small lizards.

References

External links

Naturdata's file of Scolopendra cingulata in Portugal
Interactive images

cingulata
Arthropods of Africa
Myriapods of Europe
Animals described in 1829
Taxa named by Pierre André Latreille